The 2017 TCU Horned Frogs football team represented Texas Christian University in the 2017 NCAA Division I FBS football season. The 122nd TCU football team played as a member of the Big 12 Conference and played their home games at Amon G. Carter Stadium, on the TCU campus in Fort Worth, Texas. They were led by 17th-year head coach Gary Patterson. They finished the season 11–3, 7–2 in Big 12 play to finish in second place. They lost to Oklahoma in the Big 12 Championship Game. They were invited to the Alamo Bowl where they defeated Stanford.

Previous season
The 2016 TCU Horned Frogs football team finished the regular season 6–6 and fell to 6–7 after losing 31–23 to Georgia in the Liberty Bowl.

Schedule

Game summaries

Jackson State

at Arkansas

SMU (97th Battle for the Iron Skillet)

at No. 6 Oklahoma State

No. 23 West Virginia

at Kansas State

Kansas

at No. 25 Iowa State

Texas

at No. 5 Oklahoma

at Texas Tech (60th West Texas Championship)

Baylor (113th Revivalry)

vs. No. 3 Oklahoma (Big 12 Championship)

Rankings

Honors and awards

Preseason awards
 Travin Howard (LB)
Preseason All-Big 12
 Nick Orr (S)
Preseason All-Big 12
 Austin Schlottmann (OG)
Preseason All-Big 12
 KaVontae Turpin (WR)
Second-Team Preseason All-American (Return Specialist), USA Today
Preseason All-Big 12 (Return Specialist)

Weekly awards
 Darius Anderson (RB)
Walter Camp Offensive Player of the Week, at Oklahoma State
Big 12 Offensive Player of the Week, at Oklahoma State
Earl Campbell Tyler Rose Award Player of the Week, at Oklahoma State
 Kenny Hill (QB)
Paul Hornung Award Honor Roll, vs. Kansas
Paul Hornung Award Honor Roll, vs. West Virginia
Earl Campbell Tyler Rose Award Honor Roll, vs. West Virginia
Davey O'Brien Award Quarterback of the Week, at Oklahoma State
Manning Award Star of the week, vs. SMU
Earl Campbell Tyler Rose Award Honor Roll, vs. SMU
 Adam Nunez (P)
Big 12 Special Teams Player of the Week, vs. West Virginia
 Gary Patterson (Head Coach)
Bobby Dodd Trophy Coach of the Week, at Oklahoma State
 KaVontae Turpin (WR)
Big 12 Special Teams Player of the Week, vs. Kansas

Major award watch lists
 Darius Anderson (RB)
Maxwell Award
 Ben Banogu (DE)
Chuck Bednarik Award
 Kyle Hicks (RB)
Maxwell Award
Doak Walker Award
Earl Campbell Tyler Rose Award
Senior Bowl
 Kenny Hill (QB)
Maxwell Award
Manning Award
Johnny Unitas Golden Arm Award
Earl Campbell Tyler Rose Award
 Travin Howard (LB)
Chuck Bednarik Award
Bronko Nagurski Trophy
 Patrick Morris (C)
Rimington Trophy
 Shaun Nixon (WR)
Wuerffel Trophy
Allstate AFCA Good Works Team Nominee
 Joseph Noteboom (OT)
Senior Bowl
 Adam Nunez (P)
Ray Guy Award
 Nick Orr (S)
Jim Thorpe Award
 Gary Patterson (Head Coach)
Paul "Bear" Bryant Award
Bobby Dodd Trophy
 Austin Schlottmann (OG)
Outland Trophy
Senior Bowl
 Ty Summers (LB)
Chuck Bednarik Award
Lott IMPACT Trophy
 KaVontae Turpin (WR)
Big 12 Special Teams Player of the Week, vs. Kansas
Paul Hornung Award
Earl Campbell Tyler Rose Award
 Taj Williams (WR)
Senior Bowl

Major award semifinalists
 Kenny Hill (QB)
Davey O'Brien Award
Johnny Unitas Golden Arm Award Top 20
 Patrick Morris (C)
William V. Campbell Trophy

Major award finalists
 Kenny Hill (QB)
Johnny Unitas Golden Arm Award Top 20

Honors and Awards Source: TCU Game 8 Media Notes (unless otherwise noted)

References

TCU
TCU Horned Frogs football seasons
Alamo Bowl champion seasons
TCU Horned Frogs football